Aissirimou is a village and suco (subdistricts of East Timor) in Aileu Subdistrict, Aileu District, East Timor. The administrative area covers an area of 29.81 square kilometres and at the time of the 2010 census it had a population of  2192 people.

References

Populated places in Aileu District
Sucos of East Timor